The Gullet is a   Local Nature Reserve in Maidenhead in Berkshire. It is owned and managed by the Royal Borough of Windsor and Maidenhead.

Geography and site
The nature reserve is a small strip of woodland along the railway which contains a mixture of trees on a chalky soil, along with flowering plants, scrub and rough grassland.

History
In 1999 the site was declared as a local nature reserve by the Royal Borough of Windsor and Maidenhead.

Flora
The site has the following flora:

Trees

Fagus sylvatica
Quercus robur

References

Local Nature Reserves in Berkshire